This is a list of the current ambassadors of Afghanistan. Ambassadors represent the Islamic Republic of Afghanistan, which collapsed in 2021, unless otherwise noted.

See also
 List of ambassadors
 List of diplomatic missions of Afghanistan

References

 
 
Afghanistan